KNFS-LP (98.1 FM) is a radio station broadcasting a community-oriented format. Licensed to Tulare, California, United States, it serves the Visalia-Tulare area.  The station is currently owned by The Lorax Society.

External links
 

Radio stations in California
Low-power FM radio stations in California